Paphiopedilum rothschildianum, it is commonly known as the Gold of Kinabalu orchid or Rothschild's slipper orchid, is a large sized clear-leafed species of orchid. It blooms with a tall inflorescence with up to six, large flowers. It is unique in the Corypetalum group by holding its petals almost horizontally, giving the flower a very distinctive appearance. The peak flowering period is from April to May.

Distribution 
Paphiopedilum rothschildianum (also called 'Rothschild's slipper orchid', after its discoverer) is found in the rainforests around Mount Kinabalu in northern Borneo, at elevations from 500 to 1200 meters above the sea.  It commonly grows as a terrestrial in ultramafic soil but is also found growing as a lithophyte in leaf-litter on ultramafic cliffs, usually near a river.

Reproduction 
The flower has a green and red spotted petal, which attracts any parasitic flies that think it is a crowd of the aphids they lay eggs on. As they try to do so, the flies brush against the stigma, releasing any previously collected pollen, and then getting some more from the anther.

References

Further reading

External links 
 
 
 http://www.orchidspecies.com/paphrothchildianum.htm

rothschildianum
Orchids of Malaysia
Flora of Sabah
Flora of Mount Kinabalu